The Roman Catholic Diocese of Maldonado-Punta del Este-Minas is a diocese of the Latin Church of the Roman Catholic church in Uruguay.  It was the Diocese of Maldonado-Punta del Este until, on March 2, 2020, the Diocese of Minas was united with it.

History
The diocese was erected in 1966, from the Diocese of Minas and is a suffragan of the Archdiocese of Montevideo. This diocese covers almost all the Department of Maldonado and the southern half of the Department of Rocha. Its see is at the Cathedral of Maldonado.

A previous bishop was Rodolfo Pedro Wirz Kraemer, who was appointed in 1985.

Bishops
See Diocese of Minas, which has since united with this diocese, for bishops affiliated with it.

Ordinaries
Bishops of Maldonado-Punta del Este
Antonio Corso † (26 Feb 1966 – 25 Mar 1985 Died) 
Rodolfo Pedro Wirz Kraemer (9 Nov 1985 – 15 Jun 2018)
Milton Luis Tróccoli Cebedio (15 Jun 2018 - 2 Mar 2020); see below
Bishop of Maldonado-Punta del Este-Minas
Milton Luis Tróccoli Cebedio (2 Mar 2020–present); see above

Other priest of this diocese who became bishop
Luis Eduardo González Cedrés, appointed Auxiliary Bishop of Montevideo in 2018

See also
List of churches in the Diocese of Maldonado-Punta del Este 
List of Roman Catholic dioceses in Uruguay

References

Religion in Maldonado Department
Religion in Rocha Department
Maldonado-Punta del Este
Maldonado-Punta del Este
1966 establishments in Uruguay
Christian organizations established in 1966
Maldonado-Punta del Este